Brodbeck is a surname. Notable people with the surname include:

Andrew R. Brodbeck (1860–1937), American politician
Christine Brodbeck (born 1950), Swiss dancer and author
Dan Brodbeck, Canadian record producer and audio engineer
Joshua Brodbeck, American classical organist
May Brodbeck (1917–1983), American philosopher of science
Mauren Brodbeck (born 1974), Swiss artist
Simon Brodbeck (born 1986), French artist